The Women's 4 × 200 metre freestyle relay competition of the 2022 European Aquatics Championships was held on 11 August 2022.

Records
Before the competition, the existing world, European and championship records were as follows.

Results

Heats
The heats were held at 10:15.

Final
The final was held at 18:51.

References

Women's 4 x 200 metre freestyle relay